Francis Valentine Joseph Hussey (February 14, 1905 – December 26, 1974) was an American sprint runner who won a gold medal in the 4 × 100 m relay at the 1924 Summer Olympics.

Frank Hussey, a schoolboy sensation from New York City's Stuyvesant High School, ran the third leg in the American 4 × 100 m relay team in Paris Olympics, which won the gold medal in a new world record of 41.0.

After returning from Paris, he attended Boston College and then Columbia University, and as a freshman became the leading Collegiate runner in America.

Although he was considered as a main favorite to gold medal in 100 m before the 1928 Summer Olympics, Hussey was eliminated in the heats of US Olympic Trials. After that he worked as a salesman, taught in the New York State Prison System, and served as an official at athletics events in his free time.

References

 

1905 births
1974 deaths
American male sprinters
Stuyvesant High School alumni
Athletes (track and field) at the 1924 Summer Olympics
Olympic gold medalists for the United States in track and field
Medalists at the 1924 Summer Olympics
Track and field athletes from New York City
Boston College alumni
USA Outdoor Track and Field Championships winners